This article lists the presidents of the Parliament of Andalusia, the regional legislature of Andalusia.

Presidents

References
 

Andalusia
Andalusia